Otter Creek is a  long second-order tributary to the Niobrara River in Holt County, Nebraska.

Watershed

See also

List of rivers of Nebraska

References

Rivers of Holt County, Nebraska
Rivers of Rock County, Nebraska
Rivers of Nebraska